The Bishop of Barking is an episcopal title used by an area bishop of the Church of England Diocese of Chelmsford, in the Province of Canterbury.

The Barking area comprises the east London boroughs of Barking and Dagenham, Havering, Newham, Redbridge and Waltham Forest, together with the Epping Forest and Harlow districts of west Essex. The population is 1.3 million and includes a wide mix of ethnicity and culture. The area comprises 166 churches, 60 of which are set in urban priority area parishes. The Barking area also includes the main site for the 2012 Summer Olympics in London. Initially, the see was suffragan to the Bishop of St Albans – the Diocese of Chelmsford was not created until 1914. The bishops suffragan of Barking have been area bishops since the Chelmsford area scheme was erected in 1983.

The current bishop, since 2022, is Lynne Cullens.  She had previously been Rector of Stockport and Brinnington in the Diocese of Chester since 2019.

List of bishops

References

External links
 Barking area fact sheet
 Crockford's Clerical Directory - listings

Bishops of Barking
Anglican suffragan bishops in the Diocese of Chelmsford